Griesbachites is a genus of Late Triassic ceratitids included in the Haloritidae, with widespread distribution from the Alps through the Himalaya and Timur to British Columbia.

The shell of Griesbachites is involute, subglobose to subdiscoidal, ribbed; with sloping sides converging on an arched venter. Like Juvavites except has nodes or clavi on the ventrolateral area of the phragmocone. Suture ammonitic.

References 

 Arkell et al., Mesozoic Ammonoidea. Treatise on Invertebrate Paleontology, Part L. Geological Soc. of America, and University of Kansas Press
 Griesbachites-Paleodb

Haloritidae
Ceratitida genera
Triassic ammonites
Fossils of British Columbia
Carnian first appearances
Norian genus extinctions